Kahnow or Kahnu or Kahnoo or Kahanow may refer to:
 Kahnow, Fars
 Kahnu, Kerman
 Kahnu, Zangiabad, Kerman Province
 Kahnow, Shahr-e Babak, Kerman Province
 Kahnu, Sistan and Baluchestan
 Kahnow, South Khorasan